The Dark Knight Coaster is the name of three enclosed steel roller coasters located at Six Flags Great Adventure, Six Flags Great America, and Six Flags México. They opened in 2008 and 2009, timed closely to the theatrical release of The Dark Knight. All three installations were manufactured by Mack Rides.

History

Six Flags Great Adventure
At Six Flags Great Adventure in Jackson Township, New Jersey, Batman & Robin: The Chiller and Movietown Water Effect were removed to make way for the construction of The Dark Knight. The roller coaster primarily occupies the previous location of the Movietown Water Effect, with the queue area placed in front of the building. Original plans called for the demolition of the Batman & Robin: The Chiller station and observatory but were later excluded from demolition plans. The exit was originally slated to go through the present Justice League gift shop adjacent to the ride, but this turned out not to be the case. On May 15, 2008, The Dark Knight officially opened to the public.

Six Flags Great America
At Six Flags Great America in Gurnee, Illinois, the building housing Theater Royale was extensively modified and themed as a Gotham City Rail terminal in preparation for The Dark Knight. The new ride officially opened to the public on May 21, 2008.

Six Flags New England and Six Flags México
In February 2008, construction on the ride had started at Six Flags New England before all of the necessary construction permits were in order, leading building inspector Dominic Urbinati to issue a stop-work order. Without the proper construction documents, according to Urbinati, there was no way he could ensure the project met state building and safety codes. In March, the park was still faced with having to seek a new set of permits after several changes were made to the plans previously approved by city boards. Park management still hoped to open The Dark Knight Coaster by Memorial Day weekend, but still faced hurdles from the town of Agawam due to changes in design from the original plans. The Planning Board and the Conservation Commission later approved the proposed changes, such as a  shift in the building's footprint to meet state fire safety codes, but the plans were rejected by the Zoning Board, which had previously granted a special permit for changes in height to the original plans. References to the ride were later removed from the Six Flags New England website. In April 2008, it was announced that construction on The Dark Knight Coaster had been cancelled, and that the coaster itself would be sent to another park in the future. The coaster was removed from the park and relocated to Six Flags México in Mexico City, Mexico, where it opened during the 2009 season. It has been operating at that location since March 19, 2009. Gotham City Gauntlet: Escape from Arkham Asylum took over the area at Six Flags New England in 2011.

Theme
The Dark Knight Coaster is inspired by the 2008 film The Dark Knight. Costing $7.5 million, the ride is an indoor Wild Mouse coaster that puts guests through the premise of being stalked by the Joker. It is considered a family ride rather than a thrill ride.

Summary

Queue and pre-show
After an outdoor, lightly themed queue area, riders enter a pre-show room where they view a TV broadcast of a press conference hosted by Gotham City district attorney Harvey Dent (Aaron Eckhart). One of the reporters asks about the Joker cards found at recent crime scenes. Almost immediately, The Joker himself hijacks the TV broadcast and his messages (such as "HA HA!") appear all over the walls of the room. Guests then enter the secondary queue area, which features a TV screen in which guests can see themselves. The two guests closest to the camera have joker masks digitally superimposed over their faces.

Ride
At the loading station, the cars normally move through continuously. Guests unload at the rear of the platform, after which guests from the queue immediately load. Unlike almost all the other coasters in the park, there are no gates on the loading platform. Lapbars are locked and checked as the car approaches the front of the platform, then it proceeds onto the lift. The ride itself consists of several sharp hairpin turns and sudden drops, accented by various eerily lit Gotham City buildings placed alongside the track. The ride layout is a standard Wild Mouse roller coaster layout.

See also
The Dark Knight (film)
Batman: The Dark Knight (roller coaster)

References

External links
The Dark Knight Coaster at Six Flags Great Adventure (construction blog)
The Dark Knight Coaster at Six Flags Great America (construction blog)
The Dark Knight Coaster at Six Flags México

Enclosed roller coasters
Former roller coasters in Massachusetts
Roller coasters manufactured by Mack Rides
Roller coasters in Illinois
Roller coasters in Mexico
Roller coasters in New Jersey
Roller coasters introduced in 2008
Roller coasters introduced in 2009
Six Flags Great Adventure
Six Flags Great America
Six Flags New England
Six Flags México
Roller coasters operated by Six Flags
Steel roller coasters
Wild Mouse roller coasters
Batman in amusement parks
Warner Bros. Global Brands and Experiences attractions